The women's 4 x 400  metres relay event at the 1999 European Athletics U23 Championships was held in Göteborg, Sweden, at Ullevi on 31 July and 1 August 1999.

Medalists

Results

Final
1 August

Heats
31 July
Qualified: first 3 in each heat and 2 best to the Final

Heat 1

Heat 2

Participation
According to an unofficial count, 42 athletes from 10 countries participated in the event.

 (4)
 (4)
 (5)
 (4)
 (4)
 (5)
 (4)
 (4)
 (4)
 (4)

References

4 x 400 metres relay
Relays at the European Athletics U23 Championships